Sun Java System Communications Suite is a collection of "Industrial-Strength" software services from Sun Microsystems. The supported platforms are: Red Hat Enterprise Linux, Solaris and Windows Server. Since Oracle acquired Sun in 2010, collection is now called Oracle Communications Unified Communications Suite.

What's inside
Oracle Communications Messaging Server (formerly Sun Java System Messaging Server)
Sun Java System Calendar Server
Sun Java System Instant Messaging Server
Sun Java System Communications Express
Sun Connector for Microsoft Outlook

Support for industry standards
CalDAV
iCalendar
IMAP
LMTP
POP3
SMTP
Web Calendar Access Protocol
XMPP

Multiple client support
Provides support for multiple rich clients including :
Evolution
Mail, iCal and iChat (Apple Inc.)
Microsoft Outlook (not for Outlook 2010)
Mozilla Thunderbird and Mozilla Lightning

See also
IBM Lotus Domino
Mail Server, Address Book Server, iCal Server and iChat Server (Apple Inc.)
Microsoft Exchange Server
Zimbra (VMware)

External links
 
 Wiki home

Instant messaging server software
Calendaring software
Message transfer agents
Groupware
Java Communications Suite